Gridino is a rural locality (a village) in Rezhskoye Rural Settlement, Syamzhensky District, Vologda Oblast, Russia. The population was 152 as of 2002. There are 6 streets.

Geography 
Gridino is located 40 km northeast of Syamzha (the district's administrative centre) by road. Rassokhino is the nearest rural locality.

References 

Rural localities in Syamzhensky District